DCY or DC-Y may refer to:

 Daocheng Yading Airport (IATA code), Garzê Tibetan Autonomous Prefecture of Sichuan province, China
 Daviess County Airport (FAA LID code), Indiana, US
 McDonnell Douglas DC-Y, a planned follow on to the DC-X carrier rocket